Kim Jung-bae (born August 1, 1940) is an ancient historian and archaeologist, university professor emeritus, and former President of Korea University in Seoul, South Korea. Kim currently serves as the Chairman of the Goguryeo Research Society.  

Kim received his PhD in Ancient History from Korea University and his research has centred on the rise of states in the Korean Peninsula. He was a professor in the Department of History at Korea University from 1977–2005. He served as a committee member of the National Historical Compilation Committee from 1982–2003. He became the 14th President of Korea University in 1998 and his term finished in 2002.

Kim has received honorary degrees from Yonsei University and Waseda University.

Educational Background

 February 1964: BA in Korean History from Korea University
 July 1967: MA in Korean History from Korea University
 Jan. – Jul. 1970: Visiting scholar at the University of Hawaii (Department of Anthropology)
 August 1975: PhD in Korean History from Korea University
 May 2000: Honorary PhD in Business Administration from Yonsei University
 November 2001: Honorary PhD in History from the University of Kiev, Ukraine
 2003: Honorary PhD from Waseda University, Japan

Professional Experience

 1970–1977: Lecturer, assistant professor and associate professor at the Humanities College of Korea University
 1977 -2005: Professor of Korean History at Korea University
 1980 -1981: Visiting scholar at the Yenching Institute of Harvard University
 1982 -1982: Visiting professor at the University of Paris VII, Paris, France
 1992 -1992: Chairman of the Korea Research Foundation Steering Committee
 1998-2002: President of Korea University (14th president)
 2004-2006: Inaugural president of the Koguryo Research Foundation
 2005 to date: Professor emeritus at Korea University
 2006-2008: Trustee of the Korea University Foundation
 Apr. 2008 to date: Director of the Academy of Korean Studies
 Jul. 7, 2009 to date: Director of the Korea University Foundation

Selected bibliography
 1976. Hanguk Minjok-ui Giwon [The Origins of the Korean Race]. Korea University, Seoul.
 1986. Hanguk Godae-ui Gukga Giwon-gwa Hyeongseong [The Origins and Formation of the Ancient State in Korea]. Korea University, Seoul.
 1987. Formation of Ethnic Nation and Coming of Its Ancient Kingdom States. Korea Journal 27(4):33-39.
 (editor) 1991. Bukhan-ui Uri Godaesa Insik [North Korean View of Korean Ancient History]. Vol. 2, Daeryuk Yeonguso, Seoul.

See also
History of Korea
Prehistory of Korea

References

Presidents of universities and colleges in South Korea
Historians of Korea
South Korean archaeologists
South Korean expatriates in the United States
South Korean historians
Korea University alumni
Academic staff of Korea University
1940 births
Living people